Yazdanabad (also Romanized as Yazdānābād) is a village in Gifan Rural District, Garmkhan District, Bojnord County, North Khorasan Province, Iran. At the 2006 census, its population was 185, in 50 families.

References 

Populated places in Bojnord County